Jill Kennare (16 August 1956) is an Australian former cricketer who played as a right-handed batter. She appeared in 12 Test matches and 19 One Day Internationals for Australia between 1979 and 1987, including captaining the side on their 1984 tour of India. She played domestic cricket for South Australia.

In 1985, Kennare and Denise Emerson hit a record partnership for Australia against the England women's cricket team of 176 runs for the third wicket. The record was surpassed in 2001 by Belinda Clark and Joanne Broadbent who shared an opening partnership of 197 runs against England. In late January 1985, Kennare hit the winning run in the third and final match of the 1984-1985 Women's Ashes, which was Australia's first series win against England since 1949.

International centuries

Test centuries

One Day International centuries

References

External links
 
 
 Jill Kennare at southernstars.org.au

1956 births
Living people
Cricketers from Adelaide
Australia women Test cricketers
Australia women One Day International cricketers
South Australian Scorpions cricketers